Alice Morse Earle (April 27, 1851February 16, 1911) was an American historian and author from Worcester, Massachusetts.

She was christened Mary Alice by her parents Edwin Morse and Abby Mason Clary. On April 15, 1874, she married Henry Earle of New York City with whom she had four children, including the botanical illustrator Alice Clary Earle Hyde. She changed her name from Mary Alice Morse to Alice Morse Earle. Her writings, beginning in 1890, focused on small sociological details rather than grand details, and thus are invaluable for modern social historians. She wrote a number of books on colonial America (and especially the New England region) such as Curious Punishments of Bygone Days.

She was a passenger aboard the RMS Republic when, while in a dense fog, that ship collided with the SS Florida. During the transfer of passengers, Alice fell into the water.  Her near drowning in 1909 off the coast of Nantucket during this abortive trip to Egypt weakened her health sufficiently that she died two years later, in Hempstead, Long Island.

Partial bibliography

The Sabbath in Puritan New England (1891)
China Collecting in America (1892)
Customs and Fashions in Old New England (1893)
Diary of Anna Green Winslow, A Boston School Girl of 1771 (1894)
Costume of Colonial Times (1894)
Colonial Dames and Goodwives (1895)
Margaret Winthrop (1895)
Colonial Days in Old New York (1896)
Curious Punishments of Bygone Days  (1896)In Old Narragansett: Romances and Realities (1898)
Home Life in Colonial Days (1898)
Child Life in Colonial Days (1899)
Stagecoach and Tavern Days at www.quinnipiac.edu Stagecoach and Tavern Days (1900) or at Internet ArchiveOld Time Gardens (1901)Sun Dials and Roses of Yesterday  (1902)Two Centuries of Costume in America, 1620–1820 (2 vols., 1903)

 Further reading 
 "Alice Morse Earle," in Notable American Women: Volume 1. 4th ed., Belknap Press of Harvard University Press, 1975.
 Susan Reynolds Williams, Alice Morse Earle and the Domestic History of Early America.  Amherst, MA: University of Massachusetts Press, 2013.

References

External links
 
 
 Article at Encyclopædia Britannica
 
 
 
 Review of Earle's Home Life in Colonial Days''
 Colonial days in old New York  by Alice Morse Earle.  Cornell University Library New York State Historical Literature Collection, (reprinted by Cornell University Library Digital Collections)
 Showing all quotes that contain 'Yesterday is history. Tomorrow is a mystery. and Today is a gift'.

1851 births
1911 deaths
19th-century American historians
American non-fiction crime writers
American women historians
20th-century American historians
Writers from Worcester, Massachusetts
Women crime writers
20th-century American women writers
19th-century American women writers
Historians from Massachusetts
Daughters of the American Revolution people